Belfast Victoria can refer to:

Belfast Victoria (Northern Ireland Parliament constituency)
Belfast Victoria (UK Parliament constituency)
Belfast was the original name of Port Fairy in Victoria, Australia